Abraxas paucinotata is a species of moth belonging to the family Geometridae. It was described by Warren in 1894. It is known from Tibet, the Khasi Hills and Darjeeling.

References

Abraxini
Moths of Asia
Moths described in 1894